Montalvo is a parish (freguesia) in the municipality of Constância in Portugal. The population in 2011 was 1,275, in an area of 12.81 km².

References

Freguesias of Constância